Now Deh (also Romanized as Naudeh) is a village in Vahnabad Rural District, in the Central District of Robat Karim County, Tehran Province, Iran. At the 2006 census, its population was 482, in 114 families.

References 

Populated places in Robat Karim County